The Moroni High School Mechanical Arts Building is a historic former school building in Moroni, Utah, United States, that is listed on the National Register of Historic Places (NRHP).

Description
LLocated at 350 North Center Street, it was built in 1935–36.  It was listed on the NRHP April 1985.

From its Utah State Historical Society assessment: "The building was constructed between 1935 and 1936 as a Federal Emergency Relief Administration (FERA) project. It was a duplicate of the Mt. Pleasant High School Mechanical Arts Building that was constructed at the same time. The project was approved in November 1934; construction began in January of 1935 and was completed in April 1936."

The building, in 2007, had gained a two-story tetrastyle portico.

It is one of five mechanical arts buildings listed on the National Register in Utah.  The other four are:
 Morgan High School Mechanical Arts Building (1936), Morgan, Utah
 Mount Pleasant High School Mechanical Arts Building (1935-36), Mount Pleasant, Utah
 Park City High School Mechanical Arts Building (1935-36), Park City, Utah
 Springville High School Mechanical Arts Building (1929), Springville, Utah

See also

 National Register of Historic Places listings in Sanpete County, Utah

References

External links

National Register of Historic Places in Sanpete County, Utah
Buildings and structures completed in 1935
1935 establishments in Utah